Shinden may refer to:
Kyushu J7W Shinden, an interceptor airplane
, the main building of a shinden-zukuri, a Heian period mansion in Japan
 , or honden, the most sacred part of a Shinto shrine
Shinden Station (disambiguation), several train stations